Bright Omokaro (born 24 February 1965) is a Nigerian former footballer. He competed in the men's tournament at the 1988 Summer Olympics. He works presently as the head coach of Osun United FC in the Nigeria National League

References

External links
 
 

1965 births
Living people
Nigerian footballers
Nigeria international footballers
Olympic footballers of Nigeria
Footballers at the 1988 Summer Olympics
1988 African Cup of Nations players
Place of birth missing (living people)
Association football defenders
Bendel United F.C. players